Anlong County is a county in the southwest of Guizhou province, China, bordering Guangxi to the south. It is under the administration of the Qianxinan Buyei and Miao Autonomous Prefecture.

Wildlife
Lungtou frog or Anlung odorous frog, Odorrana anlungensis, is only known from Mount Longtou in Anlong County.

Climate

References

County-level divisions of Guizhou
Qianxinan Buyei and Miao Autonomous Prefecture